Ray Garrett Jr. (August 11, 1920 – February 3, 1980 in Chicago, Illinois) was a senior partner at Gardner Carton & Douglas in Chicago until his appointment as the Chairman of the U.S. Securities and Exchange Commission (SEC) under President Richard Nixon in 1973, where he served for two years.

Biography
Garrett, a Yale College graduate, received his law degree from Harvard Law School in 1949. He served in the U.S. Army during World War II as a captain in the artillery, where he saw action at the Battle of the Bulge, was in the first American artillery battalion across the Rhine, and earned a bronze star. His father, Ray Garrett, Sr., fought during World War I.

He first joined the SEC in 1954 and served as Director of Corporate Regulation before returning to Chicago at Gardner, Carton & Douglas in 1958 as a partner. Garrett's predecessor as Chairman of the SEC, G. Bradford Cook, had resigned in disgrace, and Garrett helped re-establish trust in the SEC.

Garrett spearheaded tough legislation, making his commission one of the strongest in recent history. One of these changes was the demise of fixed commissions on stock transactions, which met with mixed results.  

Ray Garrett also participated in revising Parts VII through XI of the American Law Institute's Federal Securities Code which was published the year he died, and was a frequent contributor to journals in his field.

The Ray Garrett Jr. Corporate and Securities Institute at Northwestern University was established in memory of Garrett.

1920 births
1980 deaths
Members of the U.S. Securities and Exchange Commission
Yale College alumni
Harvard Law School alumni
Nixon administration personnel
Ford administration personnel
United States Army personnel of World War II